Libuše is a Czech female given name derived from the adjective libý, the base of which is Slavonic l'ub meaning "love", "lovable". Related names are Ljuba, Liběna and Liboslava.

Name days 
Czech: 10 July
Slovak: 30 July

Other variants 
Serbian: Libuša
Croatian: Libuša
Slovak: Libuša
Polish: Libusza
German: Libussa, Libuscha
English: Libusha

Famous bearers 
Libuše Benešová, Czech politician and first female President of the Senate
Libuše Bělunková, Czech poet and writer
Libuše Bedrnová, Czech actress
Libuše Bokrová, Czech actress
Libuše Čiháková, Czech publicist
Libuše Domanínská, Czech opera singer
Libuše Freslová, Czech actress
Libuše Geprtová, Czech actress
Libuše Havelková, Czech actress
Libuše Jarcovjáková, Czech photographer
Libuše Jiskrová, Czech actress
Libuše Komancová, Czech actress
Libuše Kosová, Czech actress
Libuše Koutná, Czech director
Libuše Márová, Czech opera singer and actress
Libuše Matějová, Czech actress
Libuše Mayerová, Czech actress
Libuše Mincová, Czech actress
Libuše Moníková, Czech writer
Libuše Müllerová, Czech actress
Libuše Pešková, Czech actress
Libuše Pospíšilová, Czech actress
Libuše Průšová, Czech tennis player
Libuše Rogozová, Czech actress
Libuše Šafránková, Czech actress
Libuše Šmuclerová, Czech doctor and director of TV Nova
Libuše Švormová, Czech actress
Libuše Štědrá, Czech actress
Libuše Vojtková, Czech dancer and actress
Libuše Zátková, Czech actress
Libuše Zemková, Czech actress

See also 
Libuše, Bohemian princess
 Lyubov (name)
 Ljubiša

Czech feminine given names